The Cari (occasionally "Kari"), Chariar or Sare language, also known as Aka-Cari, is an extinct Great Andamanese language, of the Northern group, which was spoken by the Cari people, one of a dozen Great Andamanese peoples.

In the 19th century the Cari lived on the north coast of North Andaman and on Landfall and other nearby small islands.  By 1994 the population had been reduced to two women aged over 50 living with the other few surviving Great Andamanese on Strait Island. Aka-Cari became extinct with the death of Licho in April 2020.

History
The Cari population at the time of first European contacts (in the 1790s) has been estimated at 100 individuals, out of perhaps 3500 Great Andamanese.
Like other Andamanese peoples, the Cari were decimated during colonial and post-colonial times, by diseases, alcohol, colonial warfare and loss of territory. The population was down to 39 individuals in the 1901 census, falling to 36 in 1911, 17 in 1921, and 9 in 1931.

In 1949 any remaining Cari were relocated, together with all other surviving Great Andamanese, to a reservation on Bluff island; and then again in 1969 to a reservation on Strait Island.

By 1994, the tribe was reduced to only two women, aged 57 and 59, and therefore was on its way to extinction. The last speaker, a woman called Licho, died from chronic tuberculosis on 4 April 2020 in Shadipur, Port Blair.

They are a designated Scheduled Tribe.

Grammar
The Great Andamanese languages are agglutinative languages, with an extensive prefix and suffix system.  They have a distinctive noun class system based largely on body parts, in which every noun and adjective may take a prefix according to which body part it is associated with (on the basis of shape, or functional association). Thus, for instance, the *aka- at the beginning of the language names is a prefix for objects related to the tongue. An adjectival example can be given by the various forms of yop, "pliable, soft", in Aka-Bea: 
A cushion or sponge is ot-yop "round-soft", from the prefix attached to words relating to the head or heart.
A cane is ôto-yop, "pliable", from a prefix for long things.
A stick or pencil is aka-yop, "pointed", from the tongue prefix.
A fallen tree is ar-yop, "rotten", from the prefix for limbs or upright things.
Similarly, beri-nga "good" yields:
un-bēri-ŋa "clever" (hand-good).
ig-bēri-ŋa "sharp-sighted" (eye-good).
aka-bēri-ŋa "good at languages" (tongue-good.)
ot-bēri-ŋa "virtuous" (head/heart-good)

The prefixes are,

Body parts are inalienably possessed, requiring a possessive adjective prefix to complete them, so one cannot say "head" alone, but only "my, or his, or your, etc. head".

The basic pronouns are almost identical throughout the Great Andamanese languages; Aka-Bea will serve as a representative example (pronouns given in their basic prefixal forms):

'This' and 'that' are distinguished as k- and t-.

Judging from the available sources, the Andamanese languages have only two cardinal numbers — one and two — and their entire numerical lexicon is one, two, one more, some more, and all.

See also 
 Great Andamanese language

References

External links
 Aka-Cari Swadesh List

Agglutinative languages
Great Andamanese languages
Extinct languages of Asia
Languages of India
Languages extinct in the 2020s